{{DISPLAYTITLE:C17H25N3O2S}}
The molecular formula C17H25N3O2S (molar mass: 335.46 g/mol, exact mass: 335.1667 u) may refer to:

 Almotriptan
 Naratriptan

Molecular formulas